Lujo Brentano (18 December 1844 – 9 September 1931) was an eminent German economist and social reformer.

Biography
Lujo Brentano, born in Aschaffenburg into a distinguished German Catholic intellectual family (originally of Italian descent), attended school in Augsburg and Aschaffenburg. He studied in Dublin (Trinity College), Münster, Munich, Heidelberg (doctorate in law), Würzburg, Göttingen (doctorate in economics), and Berlin (habilitation in economics, 1871).

He was a professor of economics and state sciences at the universities of Breslau, Strasbourg, Vienna, Leipzig, and most importantly, Munich (1891–1914). With Ernst Engel, the statistician, he made an investigation of the English trade unions.

In 1872, he became involved in an extended dispute with Karl Marx and Friedrich Engels. Brentano accused Marx of falsifying a quotation from an 1863 speech by William Gladstone.

In 1914, he signed the Manifesto of the Ninety-Three. After the revolution of November 1918, he served in minister-president Kurt Eisner's government of the People's State of Bavaria as People's Commissar (Minister) for Trade, but only for some days in December 1918.

Brentano died in Munich in 1931, aged 86.

Legacy
Brentano was a Kathedersozialist (reform-minded) and a founding member of the Verein für Socialpolitik. His influence on the social market economy, and on many Germans who would be leaders just after the end of World War II, can hardly be overrated. He also influenced later economists, such as his doctoral student Arthur Salz.

Note: It is often mistakenly claimed that Brentano was called Ludwig Joseph, and that "Lujo" was a kind of nickname or contraction. This is incorrect; while he was given his name after a Ludwig and a Joseph, Lujo was his real and legal first name. (See his autobiography, Mein Leben..., below, p. 18.)

Bibliography
 Brentano, Lujo (1871–72). Die Arbeitergilden der Gegenwart. 2 vols., Leipzig: Duncker und Humblot. (English: On the History and Development of Gilds and the Origins of Trade Unions. 1870.)
 Brentano, Lujo (1901). Ethik und Volkswirtschaft in der Geschichte. November 1901. München: Wolf.
 Brentano, Lujo (1910). "The Doctrine of Malthus and the Increase of Population During the Last Decades." Economic Journal vol. 20(79), pp. 371–93.
 Brentano, Lujo (1923). Der wirtschaftende Mensch in der Geschichte. Leipzig: Meiner. Reprint Marburg: Metropolis, 200ß.
 Brentano, Lujo (1924). Wege zur Verständigung - Der Judenhass. Berlin, Philo Verlag und Buchhandlung
 Brentano, Lujo (1927–29). Eine Geschichte der wirtschaftlichen Entwicklung Englands. 4 vols., Jena: Gustav Fischer.
 Brentano, Lujo (1929). Das Wirtschaftsleben der antiken Welt. Jena: Fischer.
 Brentano, Lujo (1931). Mein Leben im Kampf um die soziale Entwicklung Deutschlands. Jena: Diederichs. Reprint Marburg: Metropolis, 2004.
 Brentano, Lujo (1924). Konkrete Bedingungen der Volkswirtschaft. Leipzig: Meiner. 1924. Reprint Marburg: Metropols, 2003.
 Brentano,  Lujo (1877–1924). Der tätige Mensch und die Wissenschaft von der Wirtschaft. Reprint Marburg: Metropolis, 2006.
 Essays, including "The Industrialist".
 Antonio Russo, La rivoluzione intellettuale di Franz Brentano, Milano, Edizioni Unicopli, 2022.

See also

 Liberalism
 Contributions to liberal theory

References

External links
 

1844 births
1931 deaths
People from Aschaffenburg
People from the Kingdom of Bavaria
German economists
German people of Italian descent
Ludwig Maximilian University of Munich alumni
Academic staff of the Ludwig Maximilian University of Munich
German social liberals
University of Münster alumni
Heidelberg University alumni
University of Würzburg alumni
University of Göttingen alumni
Humboldt University of Berlin alumni
Academic staff of the University of Strasbourg
Academic staff of the University of Breslau
Academic staff of the University of Vienna
Academic staff of Leipzig University
German social reformers